Bibra Valley is an ice-free valley bounded eastward by Danum Platform, lying  northeast of Haven Mountain in the Britannia Range. It was named in association with Britannia by a University of Waikato geological party, 1978–79, led by Michael Selby. Bibra is a historical placename formerly used in Roman Britain.

References 

Valleys of Oates Land